Stupni Do is a village in the municipality of Vareš in central Bosnia and Herzegovina. It is located 3 km southeast of the city of Vareš.

History 
This small village received notoriety because of the Bosnian War Stupni Do massacre (1993), in which Croat forces killed 38 Bosniaks.

Demographics 
According to the 2013 census, its population was 135, all Bosniaks.

References

Populated places in Vareš